Saints Peter and Paul Church is a Roman Catholic church in Pitești, Romania, located at 11 Victoriei Street.

Initially, the parish functioned in a chapel dedicated in 1864, serving a local Catholic community drawn from various nationalities: Germans or Transylvanian Saxons, Austrians, Czechs, Poles, Italians and Hungarians. The current building was constructed in 1895-1896, and expanded in 1996. A new parish house was built between 1990 and 1996. The church has a choir and participates in cultural and charity activities. The parish has its feast day on June 29, and it is part of the Bucharest Archdiocese. The building is considered a historic monument by Romania's Culture Ministry.

Notes

Pitești
Historic monuments in Argeș County
Roman Catholic churches completed in 1896
19th-century Roman Catholic church buildings in Romania